Allières is a commune in the Ariège department in the Occitanie region of southwestern France.

The inhabitants of the commune are known as Alliérasois or Alliérasoises

Geography

Allières is located in the Plantaurel mountains in the Natural Regional Park of Pyrénées ariégeoises some 22 km west by north-west of Foix and some 70 km south of Toulouse. Access to the commune is by the minor D49 road which runs north from the D117 road through the commune and the village and continuing north across the mountains to join the D119 near Maury. There is also access by a minor road from the east. Apart from the village there is also the hamlet of Escougnale. The commune is heavily forested with a few farms.

Numerous streams rise in the commune mostly flowing north to the Ruisseau de Mourisse which forms the northern border of the commune and flows west to join the Arize river near Maury. There is also the Ruisseau de Peydalières rising in the west of the commune which flows west also to join the Arize.

Neighbouring communes and villages

Administration

List of Successive Mayors

Population

Culture and heritage

Religious heritage
The Parish Church of Saint Roche contains two items that are registered as historical objects:
A Painting with frame: Presentation at the temple of the child Jesus with a saint bishop (17th century)
A Painting with frame: Virgin and child surrounded by Saint Julien and Saint Nicolas de Myre (1871)

Notable people linked to the commune
The Falentin Saintenac family has many dead in their chapel adjoining the church.

See also
Communes of the Ariège department

References

External links
Allières on the National Geographic Institute website 
Allières on Géoportail, National Geographic Institute (IGN) website 
Ailleres on the 1750 Cassini Map

Communes of Ariège (department)